Brahma Lodge is a northern suburb of Adelaide, South Australia. It is located in the City of Salisbury.

History
The land on which the current suburb lies was owned by Frank Reiss who, in 1960, became the first to sell his land for subdivision. The suburb was named for the trotting horse stud of the same name that had been located on the land. Brahma Lodge Post Office opened on 14 May 1962.

Geography
The suburb lies southeast of Salisbury town centre.

Demographics

The 2006 Census by the Australian Bureau of Statistics counted 2,983 persons in Brahma Lodge on census night. Of these, 49.9% were male and 50.1% were female.

The majority of residents (68.6%) are of Australian birth, with other common census responses being England (9.4%), Italy (2.3%) and Vietnam (2.1%).

The age distribution of Brahma Lodge residents is similar to that of the greater Australian population. 66.5% of residents were over 25 years in 2006, which was the same as the Australian average; and 33.5% were younger than 25 years.

Community
The local newspaper is the News Review Messenger. Other regional and national newspapers such as The Advertiser and The Australian are also available.

Schools
Brahma Lodge Primary School is located near the centre of the suburb.

Attractions

Parks
The main greenspace in Brahma Lodge is Cockburn Green, between Hammond Avenue and Mortess Street, and Brahma Lodge Oval on Francis Road.

Transportation

Roads
Brahma Lodge is serviced by Main North Road and Park Terrace, the latter linking the suburb to Salisbury town centre.

Public transport
Brahma Lodge is serviced by buses run by the Adelaide Metro.

See also
List of Adelaide suburbs

References

External links

Suburbs of Adelaide